Marguerite Gobat (23 February 1870 – 19 July 1937) was Swiss editor, teacher and pacifist.

Biography
Marguerite Gobat was born on 23 February 1870 in Delémont, Switzerland. Her father Albert Gobat (1843–1914) was a well-known pacifist, and jointly won the Nobel Peace Prize in 1902 along with Élie Ducommun.  

She was actively involved in global peace and women’s welfare. In 1915 she founded World Union of Women for International Concord in Geneva along with Clara Guthrie d'Arcis and 35 women from different countries. She was one of the founders of Women's International League for Peace and Freedom.  

She died on 19 July 1937 in Evilard.

References

 1870 births
 1937 deaths
People from Delémont
Swiss editors
Swiss educators
Swiss pacifists
Women's International League for Peace and Freedom people